Vita Smeralda (as a pun on Costa Smeralda) is a 2006 Italian comedy film directed by Jerry Calà.

Cast

References

External links

2006 films
Films directed by Jerry Calà
2000s Italian-language films
2006 comedy films
Italian comedy films
2000s Italian films